The discography of DragonForce, an English power metal band, currently consists of eight studio albums, two live albums,  one demo album and seven singles.

DragonForce formed in London, England in 1999, under the name of "DragonHeart", and released their first and only demo, Valley of the Damned, independently in 2000. This earned them a record deal with Noise Records with whom they released their début studio album Valley of the Damned in 2003, after renaming to "DragonForce". Valley of the Damned featured their debut single of the same name. Their second studio album Sonic Firestorm in 2004 followed by their second single "Fury of the Storm" in 2005. They then signed to Roadrunner Records and released their first charting album and single, Inhuman Rampage and "Through the Fire and Flames", released in 2005 and 2006 respectively, followed by "Operation Ground and Pound" later the same year. Their remixed and remastered versions of Valley of the Damned and Sonic Firestorm were set for release in October 2007, but were postponed to 22 February 2010. Their fourth studio album Ultra Beatdown and its preceding single, "Heroes of Our Time", were released on 25 August 2008 and 4 July 2008 respectively. In 2012, the band released The Power Within with new vocalist Marc Hudson and in 2014 they released their follow up album Maximum Overload.

Studio albums

Live albums

Compilation albums

Demo albums

Singles

Music videos

Footnotes

<li>As DragonHeart.
<li>Although released in 2006 "Through the Fire and Flames" did not enter the charts until 2008.

References

External links
Official discography
DragonForce at Discogs

Discography
DragonForce
Discographies of British artists